Seno is a town located in the Savannakhet Province of Laos.

Seno holds the highest temperature ever recorded in Laos when  was observed on 12 April 2016.

References

Populated places in Savannakhet Province